Paul Medhurst (12 December 1953 – 26 September 2009) born in Scunthorpe, was a track cyclist with dual British-New Zealand nationality.

Cycling career
He won the bronze medal in the men's tandem sprint at the 1974 British Commonwealth Games partnering Philip Harland representing New Zealand. He competed for Great Britain in the 1000m time trial event at the 1976 Summer Olympics.

Medhurst was a three times British track champion, winning the British National Individual Sprint Championships in 1975,  a tandem title (1976) and a madison title (1975).

He died in Ghent, Belgium.

References

External links

1953 births
2009 deaths
British male cyclists
New Zealand male cyclists
Cyclists at the 1974 British Commonwealth Games
Commonwealth Games bronze medallists for New Zealand
New Zealand track cyclists
Sportspeople from Scunthorpe
Olympic cyclists of Great Britain
Cyclists at the 1976 Summer Olympics
Commonwealth Games medallists in cycling
Medallists at the 1974 British Commonwealth Games